Rogers Radio is a division of Rogers Sports & Media (a subsidiary of Rogers Communications) that specializes in the radio broadcasting industry. Rogers Radio is Canada's third-largest radio broadcaster (after Bell Media Radio and Stingray Group), the fourth being Corus, and the largest based in Ontario.

As of January 2015, the company owns and operates 52 radio stations (44 FM and 8 AM) in Alberta, British Columbia, Manitoba, Nova Scotia and Ontario. They previously owned 2 in New Brunswick, when they were sold to other companies in 2015.

List Of Stations

Notes

References

External links
Rogers Radio Stations
Rogers Radio Stations - Our Properties - Radio - 

1959 establishments in Ontario